Matiala Assembly constituency  is one of the 70 Delhi Legislative Assembly constituencies of the National Capital Territory in northern India. Gulab Singh Yadav of Aam Aadmi Party is the current MLA from Matiala.

Overview
Present geographical structure of Matiala constituency came into existence in 2008 (Constituency didn't exist before 2008) as a part of the implementation of the recommendations of the Delimitation Commission of India constituted in 2002.
Matiala is part of West Delhi Lok Sabha constituency along with nine other Assembly segments, namely, Uttam Nagar, Rajouri Garden, Hari Nagar, Tilak Nagar, Janakpuri, Vikaspuri, Dwarka, Madipur and Najafgarh.

Members of Legislative Assembly

Election results

2020

2015

2013

2008

References

Assembly constituencies of Delhi
Delhi Legislative Assembly